The 2016 New Mexico Democratic presidential primary was held on June 7 in the U.S. state of New Mexico as one of the Democratic Party's primaries ahead of the 2016 presidential election.

The Democratic Party's primaries in California, Montana, New Jersey and South Dakota were scheduled to be held the same day, as were the Republican primaries in the same five states, including their own New Mexico primary. Additionally, the Democratic Party held the North Dakota caucuses the same day.

Opinion polling

Results

Results by county

Analysis 
After being projected to win the state by double digits, Clinton managed a 3-point-win in New Mexico, thanks to support from majority non-white areas such as Doña Ana County which contains the city of Las Cruces and is majority Hispanic/Latino, as well as McKinley and San Juan which are largely Native American and include parts of the Navajo Nation and the Apache Nation. Clinton won by a narrow margin in Santa Fe. Sanders, meanwhile, won by a larger margin in Albuquerque, the state's largest city, and thus held Clinton to a very narrow margin statewide.

References

New Mexico
Democratic primary
2016